The  Turkish minorities/communities in the former Ottoman Empire refers to ethnic Turks, who are the descendants of Ottoman-Turkish settlers from Anatolia and Eastern Thrace, living outside of the modern borders of the Republic of Turkey and in the independent states which were formerly part of the Ottoman Empire. Thus, they are not considered part of Turkey's modern diaspora, rather, due to living for centuries in their respective regions (and for centuries under Turkish rule), they are now considered "natives" or "locals" as they have been living in these countries prior to the independence and establishment of the modern-nation states.

Today, whilst the Turkish people form a majority in the Republic of Turkey and Northern Cyprus, they also form one of the "Two Communities" in the Republic of Cyprus, as well as significant minorities in the Balkans, the Caucasus, the Levant, the Middle East  and North Africa. Consequently, the Turkish ethnicity and/or language is officially recognised under the constitutional law of several states, particularly in the Balkans.

Turkish communities

Cyprus
According to the 1960 Constitution of the Republic of Cyprus (Articles 2 and 3) the Turkish Cypriots are recognised as one of the "Two Communities" of the Republic (alongside the Greek Cypriots). Hence, legally, they have equal power-sharing rights with the Greek Cypriots and are not defined as a "minority group", despite being fewer in numbers (numbering 1,128 in the south of the island in the 2011 census). The Turkish language is an official language of the republic, alongside the Greek language. However, due to the Cyprus crisis of 1963–64, followed by the Greek-led 1974 Cypriot coup d'état and then the 1974 Turkish invasion of Cyprus, the northern half of the island was occupied by Turkey and the Turkish Cypriots declared their own "state" - the Turkish Republic of Northern Cyprus (TRNC), recognized only by Turkey - in 1983. Today it is partly populated by Turkish Cypriots and mostly by Turkish settlers. According to the 2011 "TRNC" census, the population of Northern Cyprus was 286,257. Other estimates suggests that there is between 300,000-500,000 Turkish Cypriots and Turkish settlers living in the north of the island.

Turkish minorities

Balkans

Caucasus

Levant
In the Levant the Turks are scattered throughout the region. In Iraq and Syria the Turkish minorities are commonly referred to as "Turkmen", "Turkman" and "Turcoman"; these terms have historically been used to designate Turkic (Oghuz) speakers in Arab areas, or Sunni Muslims in Shitte areas. Indeed, today, the majority of Iraqi Turkmen and Syrian Turkmen are the descendants of Ottoman Turkish settlers. and, therefore, share close cultural and linguistic ties with Turkey, particularly the Anatolian region. There is also Turkish minorities located in Jordan (Turks in Jordan) and Lebanon (Turks in Lebanon). In Lebanon, they live mainly in the villages of Aydamun and Kouachra in the Akkar District, as well as in Baalbek, Beirut, and Tripoli.

North Africa
In North Africa there is still a strong Turkish presence in the Maghreb, particularly in Algeria Libya, and Tunisia (see Algerian Turks, Libyan Turks, and Tunisian Turks). They live mainly in the coastal cities (such as in Algiers, Constantine, Oran and Tlemcen in Algeria; Misurata and Tripoli in Libya; and Djerba, Hammamet, Mahdia, and Tunis in Tunisia). In these regions, people of partial Turkish origin have historically been referred to as Kouloughlis due to their mixed Turkish and central Maghrebi blood. Consequently, the terms "Turks" and "Kouloughlis" have traditionally been used to distinguish between those of full and partial Turkish ancestry. In addition, there is also a notable Turkish minority in Egypt. Prior to the Egyptian revolution in 1919, the ruling and upper classes were mainly Turkish,  or of Turkish descent,  which was part of the heritage from the Ottoman rule of Egypt.

Other countries

See also
Misak-ı Millî
Muhacir
Balkan Turks
Turks in Europe

References and notes

 
Ethnic minorities